Elmer Berger may refer to:

Elmer Berger (inventor) (1891–1952), American inventor of the rear-view mirror
Elmer Berger (rabbi) (1908–1996), Jewish Reform rabbi known for his anti-Zionism